Steven or Stephen Epstein may refer to:

 Steven Epstein (music producer), American classical music producer
 Steven Epstein (academic), professor at Northwestern University
 Stephen Epstein (cardiologist), American physician

See also
 Stephan R. Epstein (1960–2007), British economic historian